L'Anse Grise (translated to gray cove) is an unincorporated community in Evangeline Parish, Louisiana, United States. The community is located on LA Hwy 13, approximately 1.5 miles north of the intersection of LA Hwy 10.

History
L'Anse Grise was homesteaded and settled in the mid-19th century by Dalicourt Guillory, Marius Landreneau, Francois Vidrine, Jean Baptiste Chapman, Jean Baptiste Ortego and others. "Anse" is one of the many French nautical terms used in South Louisiana and means "cove." The common erroneous translation for the name is Gray Point, which, in French, would be "Pointe Grise."  To date, it isn't known when L'Anse Grise acquired its name. The earliest recorded use of the name L'Anse Grise, found in the Vidrine Elementary School, is in 1928.

References

Unincorporated communities in Louisiana
Unincorporated communities in Evangeline Parish, Louisiana
Acadiana